The 2021–22 Western Sydney Wanderers season is the club's tenth season since its establishment in 2012, and is participating in the A-League Men for the tenth time.

On 30 January 2022, it was announced that manager Carl Robinson had been sacked. The following day, Mark Rudan was appointed as manager until the end of the season.

Players

Transfers

Transfers in

From youth squad

Transfers out

Contract extensions

Pre-season and friendlies

Competitions

Overview
{|class="wikitable" style="text-align:left"
|-
!rowspan=2 style="width:140px;"|Competition
!colspan=8|Record
|-
!style="width:30px;"|
!style="width:30px;"|
!style="width:30px;"|
!style="width:30px;"|
!style="width:30px;"|
!style="width:30px;"|
!style="width:30px;"|
!style="width:50px;"|
|-
|A-League

|-
|2021 FFA Cup

|-
|2022 Australia Cup

|-
!Total

FFA Cup

Australia Cup

A-League

League table

Matches
The opening six rounds of the 2021–22 A-League were announced on 23 September 2021. The remaining rounds were released on 29 October 2021.

Statistics

Appearances and goals 
Appearances as substitutes in brackets. Players with no appearances not included in the list.

Disciplinary record

Clean sheets

References

Western Sydney Wanderers FC seasons
2021–22 A-League Men season by team